Palmarejo is a subdivision of the city of Praia in the island of Santiago, Cape Verde. Its population was 12,037 at the 2010 census. It is situated southwest of the city centre. Adjacent neighbourhoods are Tira Chapéu to the north, Achada Santo António in the east, Quebra Canela in the southeast, Cidadela in the west and Palmarejo Grande in the northwest. The main campus of the University of Cape Verde is in Palmarejo.

References

Subdivisions of Praia